Piletocera analytodes is a moth in the family Crambidae. It was described by George Hampson in 1917. It is found in Papua New Guinea, where it has been recorded from Rook Island in the Bismarck Archipelago of Papua New Guinea.

References

analytodes
Endemic fauna of Papua New Guinea
Moths of Papua New Guinea
Bismarck Archipelago
Moths described in 1917
Taxa named by George Hampson